Shipley railway station serves the market town of Shipley in West Yorkshire, England.

Train services are mostly commuter services between Leeds and Bradford, the Airedale line (Leeds and Bradford to Skipton, via Keighley), and the Wharfedale Line (Leeds and Bradford to Ilkley). There are also a few main-line London North Eastern Railway services between Bradford or Skipton and London, and it also lies on the line from Leeds to Glasgow via the Settle-Carlisle Railway.

History
When the Leeds and Bradford Railway built the first railway link into Bradford in 1846, they did not take the shortest route, but a flatter and slightly longer one up Airedale to Shipley then south along Bradford Dale to Bradford. They built stations at several places along the route, including Shipley, which opened in July 1846.

In 1847, the Leeds and Bradford Extension Railway was built from Shipley to Keighley and Skipton, creating the triangle of lines which surrounds today's station. The north curve was opened in 1848 and was on a much tighter alignment than the present 1883 curve. The original curve would pass through the car park.

The Leeds and Bradford was absorbed by the Midland Railway in 1851, and the Midland successively became part of the LMS and British Railways.

The Ordnance Survey map of Shipley in 1852 (surveyed between 1847 and 1850) shows the station some 500 m south of the present one, where Valley Road crosses the line to Bradford. However, an article in the Bradford and Wakefield Observer in February 1849 describes the station in its present position. It is not clear if it was moved in its first few years or there is an error on the map.

The present station was built at some time between 1883 and 1892, nestling between the western (Bradford-Skipton) and eastern (Leeds-Bradford) arms of the triangle. It was designed by the Midland's architect Charles Trubshaw. Platform 3 (on the Bradford-Leeds arm) was lengthened in 1990, to serve full-length InterCity trains. The northern (Leeds-Skipton) arm of the triangle is distant from the main station and had no platforms until May 1979. Before then, trains on the Leeds-Shipley-Skipton run had to come through the station to the Bradford branch and reverse. From 1979, there was a single platform there, on the inside of the triangle, so Skipton-Leeds trains had to cross over to reach it. The current platform 1 on the north side was built in 1992.

It is now one of two remaining triangular stations in the UK: the other being Earlestown station in Merseyside. Ambergate station was previously triangular but only retains one platform and Queensbury station was closed to passengers in 1955.

Until the Beeching Axe closures of 1965, the next stations from Shipley were Saltaire on the Airedale line to the west, Baildon on the Wharfedale line to the North, Apperley Bridge in the east towards Leeds, and Frizinghall in the south towards Bradford. Baildon station closed in 1953, but on 20 March 1965, the other three of these stations closed, along with another dozen stations and the local service between Bradford and Leeds. Most of the services through Shipley were under threat and hung in the balance until the West Yorkshire Passenger Transport Executive adopted them in the 1970s. All four of these adjacent stations have since been reopened: Baildon on 5 January 1973, Saltaire in April 1984, Frizinghall in 1987, and Apperley Bridge on 13 December 2015.

Between 1875 and 1931, there was a second station, Shipley and Windhill railway station on Leeds Road very close to Shipley Station which served the Shipley and Windhill Line.

Butterfly meadow 

In the middle of the station is a small butterfly meadow. It was opened in 1993 by David Bellamy and is administered by Butterfly Conservation, Bradford Urban Wildlife Group and Leeds Groundwork Trust.

Stationmasters
The station master John Wilkinson had his salary reduced from £200 to £180 when a separate goods agent was appointed in 1873, but the position of goods agent was merged back with that of station master with the appointment of William Crowther.

William Crowther suffered a serious accident on 12 May 1891, aged only 35 years. Whilst attempting to cross the line he was run over by a locomotive which severed both feet and his right hand. He was taken to the Bradford Infirmary where both legs were amputated. He remained in Bradford Infirmary until July but recovered enough to return home. Four hundred local residents subscribed to a fund for him and he was presented with a cheque for £450. The Midland Railway found him alternative employment in their cashiers' office.

John Wilkinson 1848 – 1887 (formerly station master at Bingley)
William Edward Crowther 1887 – 1891 
John Berkin 1891 – 1909
Amos Parsons 1909 – 1921
William Clapham 1921 – 1931
Mr. Woodcraft 1931 – 1936 (formerly station master at Barrow Hill and Staveley Works, afterwards station master at Low Moor)
A.W. Bell 1936 – 1943 (formerly station master of Wem, afterwards station master at Morecambe Promenade)
W. Wright from 1943

Access and facilities

The station has 5 Platforms in a triangle.
 Platform 1 Skipton – Leeds
 Platform 2 Leeds – Skipton
 Platform 3 Bradford F.S. – Leeds (full length)
 Platform 4 Leeds – Bradford (short)
 Platform 5 Bradford – Skipton and back single line

The station lies to the east of the town centre, across Otley Road, There is no access directly from Otley Road: pedestrian access from town is either via a tunnel at the bottom of Station Road, or from Stead Street onto platform 1. Vehicular access is from the side away from town, under the bridge and up a long cobbled drive from Briggate and there is a large car-park between the main station and platforms 1/2.

There are no bus stops on the station forecourt: bus connections are either on Briggate/Leeds Road, or in the Market Square (5–10 minutes walk away). There is also no taxi rank within the station: again, passengers need to go into the town centre.

The station is fully staffed – the ticket office is open seven days per week and only closed in the evening. Ticket machines are also available, along with digital information screens and a long-line Public Address System (PA) for train running information.

Step-free access is available to platforms 2, 3 and 5. Platforms 1 and 4 can be reached by disabled passengers via lifts (there is also a subway with steep ramp to platform 4).

Services

Most of the services are commuter services operated by Northern Trains, as part of the MetroTrain network. During Monday to Saturday daytimes, these operate every 30 minutes on all of the following routes:
Leeds-Bradford Forster Square;
Leeds-Skipton;
Bradford Forster Square-Skipton;
Bradford Forster Square-Ilkley.

In the evening a half-hourly service is maintained between Leeds and Skipton. Ilkley and Skipton to Bradford are hourly. There is no direct service between Leeds and Bradford but a shuttle from Shipley to Bradford connects with Leeds departures. On Sundays, Ilkley/Skipton – Bradford and Skipton and Bradford to Leeds each operate once per hour. These services are mostly operated by Northern Trains Class 333 electric multiple units, although the new CAF Class 331 Civity units have also started to appear in service.

The LNER service from Kings Cross must access platform 3 in the station (i.e. it must run 'wrong line') as platform 4, the normal stopping point for Bradford bound services, is too short to accommodate the lengthy express trains. The northbound Kings Cross to Skipton service is the only train that does not stop here for similar reasons (platform 2 also being too short for use by a full-length express).

References

Bibliography 
 Bairstow, Martin 2004 Railways Through Airedale & Wharfedale. 
 Chapman, Stephen N. D. Railway Memories No. 7: Airedale & Wharfedaile Bellcode books. 
 Dewick, Tony 2002 Compete Atlas of Railway Station Names Ian Allan Publishing. 
 Heritage Cartography N. D. Shipley 1847 (based on the Ordnance Survey 1:10,560 County Series Map: Yourshire CGI: Survey of 1847). 
 Sheeran, George 1994 Railway Buildings of West Yorkshire, 1812–1920 Ryburn. 
 Smith, F. W. & Martin Bairstow The Otley and Ilkley Joint Railway Martin Bairstow. .
 Whitaker, Alan & Brian Myland 1993 Railway Memories No. 4: Bradford Bellcode books.

External links

Railway stations in Bradford
DfT Category D stations
Former Midland Railway stations
Railway stations in Great Britain opened in 1846
Northern franchise railway stations
Railway stations served by London North Eastern Railway
Shipley, West Yorkshire
Charles Trubshaw railway stations
1846 establishments in England